The Constitution of Canada is a large number of documents that have been entrenched in the constitution by various means. Regardless of how documents became entrenched, together those documents form the supreme law of Canada; no non-constitutional law may conflict with them, and none of them may be changed without following the amending formula given in Part V of the Constitution Act, 1982.

The constitution includes legislation that was specifically written as constitutional documents, statutes that have become entrenched since their original creation, some treaties and royal proclamations, unwritten procedures adopted from the British parliamentary system of government, and unwritten underlying values.

The oldest Canadian constitutional documents were enacted before Confederation, and originated from the English or British government. Those documents were received—along with many subconstitutional laws—into the law of Canada and its provinces by means of section 129 of the Constitution Act, 1867 (then called the British North America Act, 1867). Between Confederation in 1867 and patriation in 1982, the United Kingdom enacted some Canadian constitutional documents by means of the Colonial Laws Validity Act 1865 and the Statute of Westminster, 1931, most notably the British North America Acts. During this time, Canada also passed a small number of constitutional documents for itself. After patriation, all new constitutional documents were passed by the Parliament of Canada and the Legislatures of its provinces.

After patriation, the methods of constitutional entrenchment are:
specific mention as a constitutional document in section 52(2) of the Constitution Act, 1982;
amendments to constitutional documents using the amending formula in Part V the Constitution Act, 1982;
in some cases, reference by an entrenched document;
ruling by a court that a practice is part of Canada's unwritten constitution; or
judicial interpretation of constitutional provisions.

The list of documents for the first two methods is well-established. For the next two, however, there is debate about which documents, or which parts of those documents, are included in the constitution. In some cases, the Supreme Court of Canada has made definitive rulings regarding whether a given documents forms part of the constitution, but in many cases the question is still unclear.

Legislation mentioned in §52(2)
Section 52(2) of the Constitution Act, 1982 says "The Constitution of Canada includes (a) the Canada Act 1982, including this Act; (b) the Acts and orders referred to in the schedule; and (c) any amendment to any Act or order referred to in paragraph (a) or (b)." The schedule, in turn, lists the following documents. Most were British North America Acts and were renamed as Constitution Acts in 1982. Others include the Parliament of Canada Act, 1875, the Statute of Westminster, 1931, and acts that created new provinces or changed provincial borders.

All of these acts were originally enshrined by the Colonial Laws Validity Act 1865 in the case of acts by the United Kingdom Parliament or enshrined by the British North America (No. 2) Act, 1949 or the British North America Act, 1871 in the case of acts by the Canadian Parliament.

In addition to the acts listed here, six other acts were listed as constitutional in §52(2) but were repealed at the same time (see "Repealed constitutional documents", below).

Amendments

Part V of the Constitution Act, 1982 describes the process required for amending any constitutional document from then on. The general process requires the agreement of the federal government plus seven provinces with at least 50% of the population (section 38), but some amendments require unanimity of the provinces (section 41), and some can be done unilaterally by the federal government (section 44) or bilaterally by the federal government and a provincial government (section 43). As of 2013, eleven amendments have been made under the 1982 amending formula, one of which was later repealed.

Documents entrenched by reference

A document can become entrenched in the Constitution if it is mentioned by a document that is already entrenched. There is no conclusive list of documents, or parts of documents, that are entrenched in this way, so courts may expand or restrict this list in the future.

One notable example are agreements with the Aboriginal people of Canada. Section 35(1) of the Constitution Act, 1982 says that "the existing aboriginal and treaty rights of the aboriginal peoples of Canada are hereby recognized and affirmed", while section 25 recognizes that rights in the Charter will not abrogate or derogate from existing or future aboriginal rights. By referencing these agreements in a constitution act, these agreements are, themselves, given constitution-level authority. These rights include:
Royal Proclamation of 1763 (7 October 1763 (UK), reprinted in RSC 1985, App II, No 1); and
existing or future land claim agreements

 
Some documents became entrenched in the constitution in 1982 because the amending formula in Part V of the Constitution Act, 1982, says that their subject matter can only be amended using the amending formula. In some cases, only part of the document is affected by this. Not all relevant documents have been tested in court to see whether they have truly become Constitutionally entrenched, while others have been deemed by the Supreme Court to be part of Canada's constitution. Two notable examples are the power to make changes to the office of the Governor General of Canada and the Supreme Court of Canada. Although the documents creating those two institutions are not mentioned in §52(2) as constitutional documents, they may be partially entrenched by being included in the amending formula. Acts governing these bodies are:
Supreme Court Act (RSC 1985, c S-26) for parts about the structure of the court; and
Letters Patent, 1947 (8 September 1947, reprinted in RSC 1985, App II, No 31) for parts about the structure of the office of the Governor General.

Another subject specifically mentioned in the amending formula is the role of the Canadian monarchy. There are two key pre-Confederation documents of the English parliament that continue to govern the powers and the line of succession of the Canadian monarch: the Bill of Rights 1689 and the Act of Settlement 1701. In both cases, provisions with regard to the monarchy are to be taken literally. Additionally, the rules for the line of succession were amended by the Parliament of Canada in 2013 to align with amendments made in the United Kingdom. It has been argued that additional British documents about the monarchy are entrenched by the preamble of the Constitution Act, 1867, which says in part that Canada will have a "Constitution similar in Principle to that of the United Kingdom". The preamble may therefore entrench key British documents like the Act of Settlement, 1701, the English Bill of Rights, 1689, and the Magna Carta. However, the Supreme Court has ruled that Canadians cannot claim specific rights mentioned in those documents, and that their provisions with regard to civil rights or the constitutional order are to be taken foundationally. Documents affected by reference in the amending formula include:
English Bill of Rights, 1689 (1 William & Mary, Sess 2, c 2) for any parts relating to the monarchy;
Act of Settlement, 1701 (12 and 13 Will III, c 2) for any parts relating to the monarchy;
Succession to the Throne Act, 1937 (1 Geo. VI, c 16); and
Succession to the Throne Act, 2013 (SC 2013, c 6).

One section of the amending formula, section 41, says that "the legislature of each province may exclusively make laws amending the constitution of the province". This might entrench some pre-Confederation legislation concerning the colonies that are now Canadian provinces, but that same section allows the provinces to amend the legislation unilaterally despite them being part of the constitution.

Unwritten constitutional sources
Some constitutional rules in Canada cannot be found in any of the above documents, and have been ruled to be implicitly part of the Canadian constitution by the courts. Many of these rules are old British conventions that were incorporated into Canadian law by the preamble of the Constitution Act, 1867, which says that the Constitution should be "similar in Principle to that of the United Kingdom", much of which itself is unwritten. There are three general sources of unwritten constitutional rules: conventions, royal prerogative, and unwritten principles.

The first type of unwritten source is constitutional conventions. This includes the role of the Prime Minister of Canada, which was not mentioned in the Constitution until 1982, and even then only in passing. It also includes the fact that the governor general in most circumstances is required to grant Royal Assent to bills adopted by both houses of parliament, and the requirement that the prime minister either resign or request a dissolution and general election upon losing a vote of confidence in the House of Commons. Many of unwritten rules based on the preamble concern the procedure for how the Parliament of Canada and the Assemblies of its provinces are run. For example, in the case New Brunswick Broadcasting Co. v. Nova Scotia (Speaker of the House of Assembly), the Supreme Court of Canada ruled that parliamentary privilege is a part of the unwritten convention in the Constitution of Canada, which means that Parliament may use parliamentary privilege to take certain actions even though they violate another part of the constitution. Most of these procedures have never been addressed by the Supreme Court, so it is not clear which ones form part of the constitution.

The second type of unwritten source is the royal prerogative: reserve powers of the Canadian Crown, being remnants of the powers once held by the British Crown, reduced over time by the parliamentary system. Primarily, these are the Orders in Council, which give the government the authority to declare war, conclude treaties, issue passports, make appointments, make regulations, incorporate, and receive lands that escheat to the Crown.

The third type, unwritten principles, are values that are incorporated into the Canadian constitution by the preamble of the Constitution Act, 1867. Unlike conventions, they are legally binding. In Reference re Secession of Quebec, the court ruled that there are at least four fundamental tenets that form part of the constitutional framework of Canada: federalism, democracy, constitutionalism and the rule of law, and respect for minorities. Other principles include responsible government, representation by population, judicial independence, parliamentary supremacy, and an implied bill of rights. In one case, the Provincial Judges Reference (1997), it was found a law can be held invalid for contradicting unwritten principles, in this case judicial independence.

Judicial interpretations

Interpretation of the Canadian Constitution has been significantly affected by the decisions of courts, which have the power to determine the meaning of phrases and, in some cases, even read into it rules that are implied but not directly stated. Canada's Constitution is not limited to the interpretation that would have been used by the original drafters, unlike countries that use originalism to interpret their constitutions. The power of the courts to update the meaning of the Constitution to fit with changing times was first established in the Persons Case, which decided that the word "person" in the Constitution included women. The Persons Case referred to this principle as the "living tree doctrine".

In spite of the living tree doctrine, for several decades Canadian courts mostly limited themselves to interpreting the Constitution for issues of jurisdiction. For example, courts determined that airports were within the power of the federal government even though the original drafters of the Constitution could not have conceived of an airport. After the introduction of the Constitution Act, 1982 and the Charter of Rights and Freedoms, Canadian courts became much more active in interpretation of Constitutional questions. One notable example is in the case of gay rights and section 15(1) of the Charter. Section 15(1) lists grounds against which people may not be discriminated by the government, and includes race, religion, sex, and others, but it does not limit itself to the listed grounds. Consequently, numerous provincial superior court cases, beginning with Halpern v. Canada (Attorney General) in Ontario, ruled that sexual orientation was an unwritten protected ground under section 15(1).

Repealed constitutional documents

Repealed before 1982
There were a number of documents that are generally seen as constitutional but were repealed before the Canada Act came into effect. The Revised Statute of Canada 1970 contains a list of constitutional documents, which was drafted by the government although was not an official list like the schedule of the Constitution Act 1982 would be. That list contained the pre-1970 documents listed in the schedule of the Constitution Act 1982, plus the Royal Proclamation 1763 and the following documents. All of the following documents were either redundant with a later constitutional document, were repealed, or were spent after they served their one purpose.

Repealed in 1982 by §52(2)
There were six acts named as constitutional in §52(2) of the Constitution Act, 1982, but were repealed at the same time:

Repealed after 1982
Three constitutional documents have been replaced using the 1982 amending formula:

References 

Documents
Constitutional documents